Strawberry Branch is a stream in Linn County in the U.S. state of Missouri.

Strawberry Branch was named for wild strawberries near its course.

See also
List of rivers of Missouri

References

Rivers of Linn County, Missouri
Rivers of Missouri